Alt I Sin Tid is the debut album from Norwegian pop duo Cir.Cuz (Mats Melbye and Thomas Pedersen).  Work started on the album in mid-2011 and was released on 21 November 2011. The released of the album was preceded by the release of three singles from the album: "Radio"  (released on 28 February 2011), "Den Eneste" (released on 6 July 2011), and "Diva" (released on 17 October 2011).  Their debut single, "Radio", reached number 2 the Norwegian VG-lista charts.  Their third single, "Diva", entered the Norwegian VG-lista charts at number 20.

Track listing 
 "Radio" (3:20)
 "Ubetalt" (3:37)
 "Diva" (3:09)
 "En Vei" (3:53)
 "Den Eneste" (3:45)
 "Skinner Alene" (4:14)
 "Slu & Sleip" (3:41)
 "Soldat I Regnet" (3:33)
 "Interessert" (3:25)
 "Bambi" (4:35)
 "Business" (3:20)
 "Frelser" (3:50)

References

External links 

http://www.discogs.com/CirCuz-Alt-I-Sin-Tid/release/4450567

Cir.Cuz albums
2011 debut albums